Guillermo Quintero Calderón (1832 in Puente Nacional – 1919 in Quintero) was a Colombian soldier and politician.

He began his military career fighting the dictatorship of José María Melo under orders former President Tomás Mosquera. He reached the rank of General after having participated in several civil wars and subsequently began a political career, becoming Governor of Santander in 1888. He became President of Colombia in 1896.

References

External links

1832 births
1919 deaths
Presidents of Colombia
Presidential Designates of Colombia
Colombian generals